The Immediate Geographic Region of Viçosa is one of the 10 immediate geographic regions in the Intermediate Geographic Region of Juiz de Fora, one of the 70 immediate geographic regions in the Brazilian state of Minas Gerais and one of the 509 of Brazil, created by the National Institute of Geography and Statistics (IBGE) in 2017.

Municipalities 
It comprises 12 municipalities.

 Araponga    
 Cajuri      
 Canaã     
 Coimbra    
 Ervália      
 Paula Cândido  
 Pedra do Anta     
 Porto Firme    
 Presidente Bernardes     
 São Miguel do Anta    
 Teixeiras   
 Viçosa

References 

Geography of Minas Gerais